Copper(II) glycinate (IUPAC suggested name: bis(glycinato)copper(II)) refers to the coordination complex of copper(II) with two equivalents of glycinate, with the formula [Cu(glycinate)2(H2O)x] where x = 1 (monohydrate) or 0 (anhydrous form). The complex was first reported in 1841, and its chemistry has been revisited many times, particularly in relation to the isomerisation reaction between the cis and trans forms which was first reported in 1890.

All forms are blue solids, with varying degrees of water solubility. A practical application of the compound is as a source of dietary copper in animal feeds.

Synthesis 
Bis(glycinato)copper(II) is typically prepared from the reaction of copper(II) acetate in aqueous ethanol with glycine:

 Cu(OAc)2 + 2 H2NCH2COOH + x H2O → [Cu(H2NCH2COO)2(H2O)x] + 2 AcOH, x = 0 or 1

The reaction proceeds through a non-redox dissociative substitution mechanism and usually affords the cis isomer.

Structure 
Like most amino acid complexes, the glycinate forms a 5-membered chelate ring, with the glycinato ligand serving as a bidentate (κ2Ο,Ν) species. The chelating ligands assume a square planar configuration around the copper atom as is common for tetracoordinate d9 complexes, calculated to be much lower in energy than the alternative tetrahedral arrangement.

Cis and trans isomerism 
The unsymmetric nature of the ligand and square planar coordination thereof gives rise to two possible geometric isomers: a cis and a trans form.

Multiple ways of differentiating the geometric isomers exist, an easily accessible one being IR spectroscopy with the characteristic number of C–N, C–O, and CuII–N identifying the ligand configuration. Crystal appearance may also be of some value for isomer indication, though the ultimate diagnostic technique is X-ray crystallography.

All forms of the complex have been characterized crystallographically, the most commonly isolated one being the cis monohydrate (x = 1).

Isomerisation of the cis to the trans form occurs at high temperatures via a ring-twisting mechanism.

References

Coordination chemistry
Copper complexes
Glycinates